Beacons is an EP by the band I Like Trains. Released on 15 October 2012, the title track is taken from their album The Shallows.

Track listing
 "Beacons"
 "Rome"
 "Easter Island"
 "Jericho"
 "The Setting Sun"

References

2012 EPs
I Like Trains albums